The Esnault-Pelterie R.E.P. 1 and the R.E.P. 2 were experimental aircraft built and flown in France in the early twentieth century by Robert Esnault-Pelterie. These aircraft are historically significant because they were the first to employ a joystick as their main flight control.

R.E.P. 1 

The REP 1 was a  single-seat tractor configuration monoplane  powered by a  seven-cylinder two-row semi-radial engine driving a four-bladed propeller with aluminium blades rivetted to steel tubes.  The fuselage was made largely of steel tubing covered in varnished silk and the wings of wood.  An elongated triangular fixed horizontal stabiliser was mounted on top of the rear fuselage with a rectangular elevator mounted on the trailing edge, and a fixed fin and rudder were mounted under the fuselage.  Lateral control was effected by wing-warping. The  main landing gear consisted of a single centrally mounted wheel mounted on a pneumatic damper, with a small tailwheel mounted on the rudder. Large outrigger wheels were fitted to the tips of the wings, which featured marked anhedral. 
Esnault-Pelterie began testing the R.E.P. 1 in September 1907, initially flying the aircraft as a glider before attempting powered flights. Throughout October, these flights became increasingly successful.

The R.E.P. 1 is preserved at the Musée des Arts et Métiers in Paris.

R.E.P. 2 

The R.E.P. 2 differed from the R.E.P. 1 in having a slightly different undercarriage (of the same general arrangement)  in addition to a large ventral balanced rudder.

The aircraft was then  modified by the addition of a trapezoidal dorsal fin, to create the R.E.P. bis. It was then exhibited at the Paris Aero Salon in December 1908 and at the Aero Show at Olympia in London in 1909. It was entered for the Grande Semaine d'Aviation in Reims in August 1909, but Esnault-Pelterie did not compete there owing to an injury to his hand.

Specifications (R.E.P. 1)

Notes

References
 Gibbs-Smith, C. H. Aviation. London: NMSI, 2003 .
 Opdycke. Leonard E. French Aeroplanes before the Great War. Atglen, PA: Schiffer, 1999 
 Taylor, M. J. H. Jane's Encyclopedia of Aviation. London: Studio Editions, 1989 p. 351
 World Aircraft Information Files.  London: Bright Star, File 893 Sheet 06

1900s French experimental aircraft
REP aircraft
High-wing aircraft
Single-engined tractor aircraft
Aircraft first flown in 1907
Aircraft first flown in 1908